Fabian Schwingenschlögl (born 15 August 1991) is a German swimmer who specializes in breaststroke.

He competed in the  medley relay event at the 2018 European Aquatics Championships, winning the bronze medal. He also represented Germany at the 2019 World Championships.

He won a 2016 NCAA title representing the University of Missouri in the 100-yard breaststroke. He was a multi-time All-American and swam the breaststroke leg on Missouri's All-American medley relays.

He qualified to represent Germany at the 2020 Summer Olympics. In his Olympic debut, he qualified for semifinals in the 100-meter breaststroke, finishing in the top-10 but failing to advance to finals.

References

1991 births
Living people
German male swimmers
German male breaststroke swimmers
European Aquatics Championships medalists in swimming
Universiade bronze medalists for Germany
Universiade medalists in swimming
Medalists at the 2017 Summer Universiade
Swimmers at the 2020 Summer Olympics
Olympic swimmers of Germany
Sportspeople from Erlangen
21st-century German people